God Has Failed is a studio album by the German progressive rock band RPWL, released in 2000. It was the band's debut studio album.

Track listing
 Hole in the Sky (8:22)
Part 1: Fly
Part 2: Crawl to You
 Who Do You Think We Are (4:15)
 Wait Five Years (3:00)
 What I Need (1:56)
Part 1: Leaving
 What I Need (5:19)
Part 2: What I Need
 In Your Dreams (6:47)
 It's Alright (5:21)
 Crazy Lane (4:43)
 Fool (5:27)
 Hole in the Sky (2:39)
Part 3: The Promise
 Spring of Freedom (5:52)
 Farewell (5:50)
 God Has Failed (2:16)

Personnel
 Yogi Lang - vocals, keyboards
 Karlheinz Wallner - guitars
 Chris Postl - bass
 Phil Paul Rissettio - drums

Production
 Produced by Lang and Wallner
 Recorded and mixed at Farmlands
 Cover design by Stefan Wittmann
 Photos by Birgit Bittermann

External links
 The Official RPWL Homepage

2000 debut albums
RPWL albums